Geoffrey Toseland (31 January 1931 – 16 May 2019) was an English professional footballer who played as a winger for Sunderland.

Toseland died on 16 May 2019, aged 88.

References

1931 births
2019 deaths
Sportspeople from Kettering
English footballers
Association football wingers
Kettering Town F.C. players
Sunderland A.F.C. players
English Football League players